Enochville is a census-designated place (CDP) in Rowan County, North Carolina, United States. The population was 2,851 at the 2000 census.

History
The census-designated place had previously been an incorporated town, one of the oldest in Rowan County. It was originally chartered in 1877 but lost its incorporation in 1974. People assumed the town was not incorporated, but the charter was still active. After the Rowan County Board of Elections ordered election of town officials in 1973, the people asked to decide whether to remain incorporated, and they voted 84-41 against.

A movement to re-incorporate Enochville started in 2003, but it has been opposed by the nearby city of Kannapolis. A bill to incorporate the town was introduced in the state legislature in 2009, but it failed to make it out of committee.

Near Enochville is the Corriher Grange Hall, listed on the National Register of Historic Places (NRHP). The Gen. William Kerr House is another local property listed on the NRHP. Enochville is the birthplace of veteran 20th century radio and television actress Elvia Allman.

Geography
Enochville is located at  (35.521048, -80.663579).

is land and   (5.16%) is water.

Demographics

2020 census

As of the 2020 United States census, there were 2,893 people, 1,235 households, and 827 families residing in the CDP.

2000 census
As of the census of 2000, there were 2,851 people, 1,143 households, and 846 families residing in the CDP. The population density was 645.5 people per square mile (249.0/km2). There were 1,219 housing units at an average density of 276.0 per square mile (106.5/km2). The racial makeup of the CDP was 95.97% White, 2.03% African American, 0.46% Native American, 0.60% Asian, 0.07% Pacific Islander, 0.42% from other races, and 0.46% from two or more races. Hispanic or Latino of any race were 2.14% of the population.

There were 1,143 households, out of which 28.1% had children under the age of 18 living with them, 61.2% were married couples living together, 9.5% had a female householder with no husband present, and 25.9% were non-families. 22.8% of all households were made up of individuals, and 11.0% had someone living alone who was 65 years of age or older. The average household size was 2.47 and the average family size was 2.88.

In the CDP, the population was spread out, with 22.4% under the age of 18, 6.2% from 18 to 24, 28.7% from 25 to 44, 26.2% from 45 to 64, and 16.5% who were 65 years of age or older. The median age was 40 years. For every 100 females, there were 88.7 males. For every 100 females age 18 and over, there were 90.4 males.

The median income for a household in the CDP was $38,438, and the median income for a family was $46,603. Males had a median income of $34,115 versus $20,819 for females. The per capita income for the CDP was $16,558. About 7.2% of families and 8.2% of the population were below the poverty line, including 12.3% of those under age 18 and 19.9% of those age 65 or over.

Education
Students in the area are served primarily by the Rowan–Salisbury School System. The former Enochville Elementary School, which was closed in June of 2021, is located in the area and most students attend South Rowan High School in nearby Landis.

References

Census-designated places in Rowan County, North Carolina
Census-designated places in North Carolina